The 2023 Cronulla-Sutherland Sharks season is the 57th in the club's history. The club is coached by Craig Fitzgibbon in his second season with the Sharks and captained by Dale Finucane and Wade Graham. The team is currently competing in the National Rugby League's 2023 Telstra Premiership.

Milestones 
Round 1: Oregon Kaufusi made his debut for the club, after previously playing for the Parramatta Eels.
Round 3: Jesse Ramien played his 100th career game.

Fixtures

Pre-season
Source:

Regular season
Source:

Ladder

Squad

Player movements

Recruited

Released

Player appearances

Representative honours

Squad statistics

NSWRL Major Comps

Knock-On Effect NSW Cup (Newtown Jets)

Pre-season
Source:

Regular season
Source:

Jersey Flegg Cup (U21s)

Regular season
Source:

Harvey Norman Women's Premiership

Regular season
Source:

NSWRL Junior Reps

SG Ball Cup (U19s)

Regular season
Source:

Harold Matthews Cup (U17s)

Regular season
Source:

Tarsha Gale Cup (U19s)

Regular season
Source:

Awards

2023 Dally M Awards

Sharks Awards Night

Other awards
Preston Campbell Medal: Nicho Hynes

Notes

References

Cronulla-Sutherland Sharks
Cronulla-Sutherland Sharks seasons